Michael P. Guingona (born 1962), also known as Mike Guingona, is an American politician of Filipino descent who served as a Councilmember for the city of Daly City, California from 1993 to 2018, including several terms as Mayor. He is an attorney in private practice. He was first elected  as a Daly City Council member in 1993 and became the youngest mayor at age 33 in 1995. He was elected as a City Council member four times.

Guingona was the first Filipino American elected to the City Council of Daly City. The year 2005 marked his fourth term as Mayor of Daly City.

Guingona also hosted the TV shows Citizen Pinoy and Pinagmulan on The Filipino Channel or TFC which shows on cable TV.

Biography and career

Early life
Guingona was born in San Francisco, California, but moved to Daly City in 1965 at the age of 3. He grew up in Daly City and attended the Daly City Public Schools from K-12. He graduated from Westmoor High School where, during his senior year, he was elected class president. Guingona participated in, football, swimming, track, and wrestling in high school.

Gunigona's great-grandfather served as governor of Batangas, a province of the Philippines.

Guingona attended Skyline College for two years  where he continued wrestling before attending the University of California at Los Angeles where he earned a B.A. in History. When he returned to Daly City, he went to the University of San Francisco Law School to pursue his Juris Doctor. He graduated in 1989 and was admitted to the State Bar of California in the same year. He established his own private practice in 1999 in San Francisco, specializing in criminal defence.

Political career
Guingona first ran for office in 1992, when he came in 5th in a field of 12. He has since served several terms on council and four terms as mayor. His first successful campaign was viewed as a significant event in the Bay Area and by the broader Filipino-American community, as he was the first Filipino American elected to City Council in Daly City, a city often referred to "Little Manila," due to its large population of immigrants form the Philippines.  Guigona, who speaks English with a foreign accent, ran an issues-oriented campaign appealing to citizens of all ethnic origins, and was criticized by some Filipino activists for "lack of Filipinoness."  Guigonas responded by saying that, "I don't even want to take any of the vestiges of the system in the Philippines and bring them here because they don't work here."

His colleagues in the City Council selected him to serve as Mayor in 1995. He was the youngest to serve as mayor of Daly City at age 33. During his first term, he continued to work as a full-time Deputy Public Defender in the San Francisco Public Defender's Office. He left the Public Defender's Office in 1999 and established a private practice in San Francisco specializing in criminal defense. Guingona was elected to a second term as Mayor in 1997, a third in 2001, and a fourth term in 2005. In addition, when Guingona was not the Mayor in 2005, served as the vice mayor.

The number of people living within the Daly City city limits swelled from 40,000 to over 100,000 during Guingona's lifetime. By the year 2000, Filipino Americans accounted for nearly a third of the population. He chose not to run for re-election in 2018.

In addition to his duties as a City Council member, Guingona has served his community as a member of the San Mateo County (SMC) Transit District Board of Directors, which he chaired in 2001 and the San Mateo County Transportation Authority, which he chaired in 2003. He was defeated for his fourth term in 2007. He was also actively involved with the Sister City Committee and was instrumental in initiating the Daly City-Quezon City Sister City partnership.

Professional affiliations
Guingona's professional affiliations include membership in the California Trial Lawyers Association, the State Bar of California, the Bar Association of San Francisco, the Filipino Bar Association of Northern California, and the California Public Defenders Association.

Television shows
Guingona co-hosted the program Citizen Pinoy on The Filipino Channel which was launched in 2005 in the U.S. and the Philippines. He hosted for four seasons.

Guingona also hosted the show Pinagmulan on The Filipino Channel. This was a reality-TV show that helps Filipino Americans connect with their family and friends back in the Philippines. "Pinagmulan" means "origins" or specifically "where one came from" in Tagalog. The show aired both in the United States and in the Philippines. The show lasted 14 episodes in 2006.

References

Mayor Mike is a busy man
Guingona is Daly City vice mayor

Further reading
Political Philosophy of Michael Guingona
Official Statement of Michael Guingona
Functions of the City Government and the City Council

External links
The People's Guide to Mayor Michael Guingona

Living people
1962 births
Mayors of places in California
People from Daly City, California
American lawyers
American politicians of Filipino descent
American mayors of Filipino descent
California politicians of Filipino descent
Public defenders